Jarrod Olson (born July 12, 1974) is an American basketball coach who is currently the head women's basketball coach at California Baptist University, a role he has held since 2012.

Head coaching record

Notes

References

External links 
 California Baptist Lancers profile

1974 births
Living people
Basketball coaches from Nebraska
Doane Tigers men's basketball players
Emporia State Lady Hornets basketball coaches
High school basketball coaches in Nebraska
Bellevue Bruins men's basketball coaches
Creighton Bluejays women's basketball coaches
Florida Southern Moccasins women's basketball coaches
California Baptist Lancers women's basketball coaches